Malaya Mushnya is a rural locality (a village) in Yershovskoye Rural Settlement, Sheksninsky District, Vologda Oblast, Russia. The population was 17 as of 2002.

Geography 
Malaya Mushnya is located 29 km north of Sheksna (the district's administrative centre) by road. Bolshaya Mushnya is the nearest rural locality.

References 

Rural localities in Sheksninsky District